Corpo de Fuzileiros Navais can refer to:

 Brazilian Marine Corps
 Portuguese Marine Corps